Today is a defunct afternoon newspaper from the India Today Group, founded on 29 April 2002. It was replaced by a newspaper called Mail Today, which is published by a joint venture with Daily Mail (part of the Associated Newspapers group).

References

Daily newspapers published in India
Defunct newspapers published in India
India Today Group
Publications established in 2002
2002 establishments in India